Phoxinus bigerri, the Adour minnow, is a species of minnow that was described in 2007. It is found in the Adour drainage basin in France and the Ebro basin in Spain and Andorra, it has been introduced to the Douro system. It is a gregarious species which can be found in cold, clear, fast flowing streams with gravel or stony substrates. It spawns in April to June, its main food is small invertebrates.

References

External links
 Three new species of minnow described

bigerri
Taxa named by Maurice Kottelat
Fish described in 2007